HISD may stand for:

 Hale Center Independent School District, in Hale Center, Texas
 Hallettsville Independent School District, in Hallettsville, Texas
 Hallsburg Independent School District, in Hallsburg, Texas
 Hallsville Independent School District, in Hallsville, Texas
 Hamilton Independent School District, in Hamilton, Texas
 Hamlin Independent School District, in Hamlin, Texas
 Hamshire-Fannett Independent School District, Jefferson County, Texas
 Happy Independent School District, in Happy, Texas
 Hardin Independent School District, in Hardin, Texas
 Hardin-Jefferson Independent School District, in Sour Lake, Texas
 Harlandale Independent School District, in San Antonio, Texas
 Harleton Independent School District, in Harleton, Texas
 Harlingen Consolidated Independent School District, in Harlingen, Texas
 Harmony Independent School District, in Upshur County, Texas
 Harper Independent School District, in the community of Harper
 Harrold Independent School District, in Harrold, Texas
 Hart Independent School District, in Hart, Texas
 Hartley Independent School District, in Hartley, Texas
 Harts Bluff Independent School District, in Titus County, Texas
 Haskell Consolidated Independent School District, in Haskell, Texas
 Hawkins Independent School District, in Hawkins, Texas
 Hawley Independent School District, in Hawley, Texas
 Hays Consolidated Independent School District, in Kyle, Texas
 Hearne Independent School District, in Hearne, Texas
 Hedley Independent School District, in Hedley, Texas
 Hemphill Independent School District, in Hemphill, Texas
 Hempstead Independent School District, in Hempstead, Texas
 Henderson Independent School District, in Henderson, Texas
 Henrietta Independent School District, in Henrietta, Texas
 Hereford Independent School District, in Hereford, Texas
 Hermleigh Independent School District, in Hermleigh, Texas
 Hico Independent School District, in Hico, Texas
 Hidalgo Independent School District, in Hidalgo, Texas
 Higgins Independent School District, in Higgins, Texas
 High Island Independent School District, in Galveston County, Texas
 Highland Independent School District, in southwestern Nolan County, Texas
 Highland Park Independent School District (Potter County, Texas) 
 Highland Park Independent School District, in Dallas County, Texas
 Hillsboro Independent School District, in Hillsboro, Texas
 Hitchcock Independent School District, in Hitchcock, Texas
 Holland Independent School District, in Holland, Texas
 Holliday Independent School District, in Holliday, Texas
 Hondo Independent School District, in Hondo, Texas
 Honey Grove Independent School District, in Honey Grove, Texas
 Hooks Independent School District, in Hooks, Texas
 Houston Independent School District, in Houston, Texas
 Howe Independent School District, in Howe, Texas
 Hubbard Independent School District (Bowie County, Texas) 
 Hubbard Independent School District (Hill County, Texas) 
 Huckabay Independent School District, Huckabay, Texas
 Hudson Independent School District, in Hudson, Texas
 Huffman Independent School District, in Huffman, Texas
 Hughes Springs Independent School District, in Hughes Springs, Texas
 Hull-Daisetta Independent School District, in Daisetta, Texas
 Humble Independent School District
 Hunt Independent School District, in Hunt, Texas
 Huntington Independent School District, in Huntington, Texas
 Huntsville Independent School District, in Huntsville, Texas
 Hurst-Euless-Bedford Independent School District 
 Hutto Independent School District, in Hutto, Texas
 Huron Intermediate School District, in Bad Axe, Michigan